Lawrence or Larry Kramer may refer to:
 Lawrence Francis Kramer (born 1933), American politician, two-time mayor of Paterson, New Jersey
 Larry Kramer (1935–2020), American playwright, author, public health advocate, and LGBT rights activist
 Larry Kramer (American football) (born 1942), former American football player and coach
 Lawrence Kramer (musicologist) (born 1946), American academic and musicologist
 Larry Kramer (legal scholar) (born 1958), American lawyer and academic, dean of Stanford Law School

See also
 Lawrence William Cramer (1897–1978), civilian governor of the United States Virgin Islands